William McCarty may refer to:

 William M. McCarty, U.S. Representative from Virginia
 William M. McCarty (judge), Utah Supreme Court justice
 William Tibertus McCarty, American Roman Catholic clergyman
 William Bonner McCarty, founder of the Jitney Jungle

See also
William McCarthy (disambiguation)